Your Funeral... My Trial is the fourth studio album by Nick Cave and the Bad Seeds, released on 3 November 1986 by Mute Records. Your Funeral... My Trial was originally released as a double EP. The album was issued on CD with a different running order and the additional track "Scum". During this period in his life, Cave was steeped in heroin addiction, perhaps evidenced by the melancholy, desperate mood of this album. 
This was the final Bad Seeds album to feature Barry Adamson until he returned for Push the Sky Away (2013).

Cave later said, "That particular record, which is my favourite of the records we've done, is very special to me and a lot of amazing things happened, musically, in the studio. There are some songs on that record that as far as I'm concerned are just about perfect as we can get really- songs like "The Carny", "Your Funeral, My Trial", and "Stranger Than Kindness", I think are really quite brilliant." Your Funeral... My Trial was the band's first album to reach the ARIA Top 100 Albums Chart, where it peaked at number 98, and also reached number one on the UK Independent Albums Chart.

The album was remastered and reissued on 27 April 2009 as a collector's edition CD/DVD set. The CD features the original 8-song vinyl double EP's track listing and track order, while "Scum" is featured as a bonus audio track on the accompanying DVD.

Recording
Producer Flood said, "I remember Mick Harvey arrived in the studio with the guts of an old grand piano, that was the basis of the sound. It was just the strings, attached to a metal frame. He tuned certain notes, and used a guitar plectrum to pick the notes. It then ended up as "The Carny". That was the first day of recording Your Funeral… My Trial, and that kind of set the tone for the whole record."

Reflecting on the album in 2020, guitarist Mick Harvey noted: "[The album] gave us the template to go forward with. It was organised rather than rambling. It all felt complete even though it was a disparate set of sounds and styles. It felt like it belonged to us. It sounded like The Bad Seeds."

Movies
Nick Cave and the Bad Seeds appeared in the 1987 Wim Wenders film Der Himmel über Berlin, performing "The Carny" (which is heard once before the performance scene) and "From Her to Eternity". "The Carny" also inspired the 2003 animated short film Jo Jo in the Stars, which won the BAFTA Award for Best Animated Short Film. The film was created and directed by Marc Craste, who said about "The Carny": "The lyrics read like a short story, it seemed to suggest a film – a straight visual interpretation of the text ..."

Track listing

Personnel
Nick Cave and the Bad Seeds
Nick Cave – vocals (1–9), piano (5, 7, 8), hammond (1, 3, 4, 6), harmonica (1, 2)
Mick Harvey – bass guitar (1, 6–9), guitar (1, 3, 5–8), drums (1, 3, 4, 8), snare drum (7), piano (2, 3), organ (2), glockenspiel (2), xylophone (2, 7), backing vocals (6)
Blixa Bargeld – guitar (1–9), co-lead vocals (2)
Barry Adamson – bass (3, 5)
Thomas Wydler – drums (2, 3, 5, 7, 9), fire extinguisher (7)

Technical personnel 
Flood – producer, engineer, mixing
Tony Cohen – producer, engineer

Design personnel
Nick Cave – art direction
Paul White – art direction
Christoph Dreher – photography

Personnel for Your Funeral... My Trial adapted from the album's liner notes.

Chart positions

References

External links
 Your Funeral... My Trial on the band's official web site
 Your Funeral... My Trial at Discogs
 

1986 albums
Nick Cave albums
Mute Records albums
Albums produced by Flood (producer)
Albums produced by Tony Cohen